Hoboken Public Schools is a comprehensive community public school district that serves children in pre-kindergarten through twelfth grade in Hoboken, in Hudson County, New Jersey, United States. The district is one of 31 former Abbott districts statewide that were established pursuant to the decision by the New Jersey Supreme Court in Abbott v. Burke which are now referred to as "SDA Districts" based on the requirement for the state to cover all costs for school building and renovation projects in these districts under the supervision of the New Jersey Schools Development Authority.

As of the 2020–21 school year, the district, comprised of five schools, had an enrollment of 3,138 students and 229.0 classroom teachers (on an FTE basis), for a student–teacher ratio of 13.7:1.

The district is classified by the New Jersey Department of Education as being in District Factor Group "FG", the fourth-highest of eight groupings. District Factor Groups organize districts statewide to allow comparison by common socioeconomic characteristics of the local districts. From lowest socioeconomic status to highest, the categories are A, B, CD, DE, FG, GH, I and J.

The district participates in the Interdistrict Public School Choice Program, having been approved on November 2, 1999, as one of the first ten districts statewide to participate in the program. Seats in the program for non-resident students are specified by the district and are allocated by lottery, with tuition paid for participating students by the New Jersey Department of Education.

Schools
Schools in the district (with 2020–21 enrollment data from the National Center for Education Statistics) are:

Elementary schools
Joseph F. Brandt Elementary School with 529 students in grades K-5
 Charles Bartlett, Principal
Thomas G. Connors Elementary School with 292 students in grades K-5
 Juliana Addi, Principal
 Wallace Elementary School with 594 students in grades K-5
 Martin Shannon, Principal

Middle school
 Hoboken Middle School with 387 students in grades 6-8
 Anna Marra, Principal

High school

 Hoboken High School with 428 students in grades 9-12
 Robin Piccapietra, Principal

Former schools:
 Joseph F. Brandt Middle School
 A.J. DeMarest Middle School

Administration
Core members of the district's administration are:
 Christine Johnson, Superintendent
 Joyce A. Goode, Business Administrator / Board Secretary

Board of education
The district's board of education, comprised of nine members, sets policy and oversees the fiscal and educational operation of the district through its administration. As a Type II school district, the board's trustees are elected directly by voters to serve three-year terms of office on a staggered basis, with three seats up for election each year held (since 2012) as part of the November general election. The board appoints a superintendent to oversee the district's day-to-day operations and a business administrator to supervise the business functions of the district.

References

External links

 
 
 Data for the Hoboken Public Schools, National Center for Education Statistics

Public Schools
New Jersey Abbott Districts
New Jersey District Factor Group FG
School districts in Hudson County, New Jersey